Raôul Duguay (born February 13, 1939) is a Canadian artist, poet, musician, and political activist in the province of Quebec, Canada. He has been an active performer since 1966. Duguay is a longtime supporter of the Quebec sovereignty movement and has run for public office on at least two occasions.

Artist
Duguay was born in Val-d'Or in the Abitibi-Témiscamingue region of Quebec, an event that he later chronicled on the semi-autobiographical track "La bittt à Tibi" on his first album. He began writing poetry in the 1950s, and his first two anthologies were published in 1966 and 1967.

He met Walter Boudreau in 1967, and the two artists formed L'Infonie shortly thereafter. This project was intended both as a music group and a new approach to collective improvisation; Duguay published its manifesto in 1970. The group released a number of albums on the avant-garde side of Quebec's progressive rock and jazz-rock scenes before dissolving in 1973. Boudreau and Duguay have re-united on occasion since then, including in 2007 for an Orgues et Couleurs festival.

Duguay released his first solo album in 1975, entitled Alllô tôulmônd; this album features "Tôuttt etô bôuttt," one of his best known tracks. The following year, he performed in front of 400,000 people at the province's Fête nationale, an annual Quebec nationalist cultural event. Duguay released several more solo albums in the seventies, eighties, and nineties; after a gap of eleven years, he returned with J'ai soif in 2010. His song "La bittt à Tibi" was inducted into the Canadian Songwriters Hall of Fame in 2008.

Duguay also provided the music for the film Wild Flowers (Les fleurs sauvages) (1982), for which he received a Genie nomination. In 1984, he took part in a musical collaboration with Parti Québécois legislator Gilles Baril. In 1996, he provided the text for a revised version of Terry Riley's In C.

Duguay has continued to publish works of poetry. His sixteenth volume, entre la lettre et l'esprit, was issued in 2001. He has also worked in the visual arts as a painter and sculptor.

Politics
Duguay is a longtime supporter of Quebec sovereigntism. In his poem Trente Lettres (1995), he described Canada as a father who "never gave mother [Quebec] an orgasm." In 2010, he signed a public letter criticizing the organizers of Quebec City's Festival d'été for booking mostly anglophone acts to perform.

Duguay ran for the House of Commons of Canada in the 1972 federal election as a non-affiliated candidate in Longueuil, under the name "Raôul Wéziwézô Duguay." He finished well behind Liberal candidate Jacques Olivier. In the 1998 provincial election, he ran as a candidate of the governing Parti Québécois in Brome-Missisquoi. He finished second to Liberal incumbent Pierre Paradis.

Discography

With L'Infonie 
 1969 : L'Infonie Vol. 3 - Kotaï, London Records
 1971 : Vol. 33 : le Mantra - Kotaï, London Records
 1972 : L’Infonie Vol. 333 - Kotaï, London Records
 1974 : L'infonie Vol. 3333 - Kotaï, London Records

Solo 
Alllô Tôulmônd, 1975
L'Envol, 1976
M, 1977
Vivant Avec Tôulllmônd, 1978
Lettre à Tôulllmônd, 1980
Le Chanteur de pomme, 1982
Tout ce qui compte, 1983
Douceur, 1985 
Monter en amour, 1993
Caser, 1999
J'ai soif, 2010

Compilations 
 1979 : Ôn S'm Ô Kébèk
 1992 : Monter En Amour

Collaborations 
 1975 : Les Porches by Maneige - Vocals and trumpet on the title song 
 1986 : Paix Sans Frontière - Raôul gave one of his songs L'oiseau pour la paix
 1989 : Nova - with Michel Robidoux 
 1992 : Atlantide / Golgot(h)a - With Michel-Georges Brégent and Walter Boudreau - Raôul on : Golgot(h)a with Walter Boudreau
 1999 : La santé par le rire - by Jean Drouin
 2000 : In C - by Terry Riley - With Michel-Georges Brégent and Walter Boudreau - Raôul vocals on the title song In C
 2006 : Septentrion - by Anodajay - Raôul vocals on Le Beat À Ti-Bi

Legacy 
His name appears among the friendships of Arcimboldi in Woes of The True Policeman by Roberto Bolaño.

Electoral record

Bibliography 
 Raôul Duguay et al., Raôul Duguay ou : le poète à la voix d'ô, Montréal, L'Aurore, 1979.

References
Citations

Further reading
 L'Heureux, Christine, et al. Raoul Duguay, ou, le Poète à la voix d'Ô, in series, L'Aurore. Montréal: Éditions Univers, 1979.
 Gilmore, John. Swinging in Paradise: The Story of Jazz in Montreal. Montreal: Véhicule Press, 1988; Victoria: Ellipse Editions, 2011. 
 Gilmore, John. Who's Who of Jazz in Montreal: Ragtime to 1970. Montreal: Véhicule Press, 1989.

External links
Raôul Duguay Official site

1939 births
Living people
People from Val-d'Or
Quebec sovereigntists
Musicians from Quebec
Writers from Quebec
Parti Québécois candidates in Quebec provincial elections
Candidates in the 1972 Canadian federal election
Independent candidates for the Canadian House of Commons